Shawan Park station is a subway station in Changsha, Hunan, operated by the Changsha subway operator Changsha Metro.

Station layout
The station has one island platform.

History
The station opened on 29 April 2014.

Surrounding area
Shawan Park
The Gym of Hunan Province
Hunan Sports Vocational College

References

Railway stations in Hunan
Railway stations in China opened in 2014